Stow St. Mary Halt railway station was a halt that served the village of Stow Maries, Essex.

It was opened on 24 September 1928 by the London and North Eastern Railway on the single-track branch line (Engineer's Line Reference WFM) that the Great Eastern Railway had opened on 1 October 1889 linking Woodham Ferrers to Maldon West. The station served the village of Stow Maries, but the station was named differently supposedly on the insistence of the vicar.

It was closed in September 1939 but the line remained in use for goods traffic until 1959 or 1953. It is now Stow Maries Halt nature reserve, which is managed by the Essex Wildlife Trust.

References

External links
 Stow St Mary Halt on navigable old O. S. map

Disused railway stations in Essex
Former London and North Eastern Railway stations
Railway stations in Great Britain opened in 1928
Railway stations in Great Britain closed in 1939